Kenneth "Kenny" Girard (born December 8, 1936) is a Canadian retired professional ice hockey player who played 7 games in the National Hockey League with the Toronto Maple Leafs between 1956 and 1960. The rest of his career, which lasted from 1956 to 1962, was spent in the minor leagues.

Career statistics

Regular season and playoffs

External links
 

1936 births
Living people
Canadian ice hockey right wingers
Pittsburgh Hornets players
Rochester Americans players
San Francisco Seals (ice hockey) players
Shawinigan-Falls Cataracts (QSHL) players
Ice hockey people from Toronto
Sudbury Wolves (EPHL) players
Toronto Maple Leafs players
Toronto Marlboros players